Blake Hillman (born January 26, 1996) is an American professional ice hockey defenseman who is currently playing for the Hartford Wolf Pack in the American Hockey League (AHL). Hillman was drafted by the Chicago Blackhawks in the sixth round, 173rd overall, in the 2016 NHL Entry Draft.

Playing career
Hillman played two seasons in the USHL with the Dubuque Fighting Saints and Waterloo Black Hawks, before attending the University of Denver. Hillman played three years at the University of Denver where he was a member of the 2017 NCAA Champion Denver Pioneers. Hillman was drafted in the sixth round, 173rd overall, in the 2016 NHL Entry Draft.

At the end of his junior year, Hillman signed a two year entry level contract with the Blackhawks on March 27, 2018, and made his NHL debut on March 30, 2018, in a game between the Blackhawks and the Colorado Avalanche. Hillman recorded his first career NHL goal on April 4, 2018, in a game against the St. Louis Blues, to help the Blackhawks win 4–3.

As an impending restricted free agent, Hillman was not tendered a qualifying offer by the Blackhawks, releasing him as a free agent on June 25, 2019. With limited interest from NHL/AHL clubs, Hillman signed a one-year contract with the Toledo Walleye of the ECHL on July 26, 2019. In the 2019–20 season, Hillman contributed with 13 points through 35 regular season games with the Walleye, while also leaving on loan on two occasions by signing two tryout contracts in the AHL with the Grand Rapids Griffins and Stockton Heat.

On January 20, 2021, Hillman extended his professional career by signing with the South Carolina Stingrays of the ECHL for the 2020–21 season.

Following the 2021–22 season, having played with the Toledo Walleye in the ECHL and the Grand Rapids Griffins, Providence Bruins in the AHL, Hillman was signed to a one-year AHL contract with the Hartford Wolf Pack on July 6, 2022.

International play
Hillman represented Team USA at the 2014 World Junior A Challenge where he helped Team USA win their 6th gold medal.

Career statistics

References

External links
 

1996 births
Living people
American men's ice hockey defensemen
Chicago Blackhawks players
Chicago Blackhawks draft picks
Denver Pioneers men's ice hockey players
Dubuque Fighting Saints players
Grand Rapids Griffins players
People from Elk River, Minnesota
Ice hockey players from Minnesota
Providence Bruins players
Rockford IceHogs (AHL) players
South Carolina Stingrays players
Stockton Heat players
Toledo Walleye players
Waterloo Black Hawks players